Andre Toussaint (born August 26, 1981) is a Trinidadian football player. He currently plays for W Connection of the TT Pro League.

References

External links
 Andre Toussaint player profile at SocaWarriors.net
 Andre Toussaint profile from MLF Sports

Trinidad and Tobago footballers
TT Pro League players
Joe Public F.C. players
W Connection F.C. players
Point Fortin Civic F.C. players
Expatriate soccer players in the United States
United Soccer League (1984–85) players
Charleston Battery players
1981 births
Living people
2007 CONCACAF Gold Cup players
Association football forwards
Trinidad and Tobago international footballers